Burgh by Sands is a civil parish in the City of Carlisle in Cumbria, England. It contains 55 listed buildings that are recorded in the National Heritage List for England. Of these, one is listed at Grade I, the highest of the three grades, three are at Grade II*, the middle grade, and the others are at Grade II, the lowest grade. The parish contains the villages of Burgh by Sands, Longburgh, Dykesfield, Boustead Hill, Moorhouse and Thurstonfield, and the surrounding countryside. A feature of the parish it that some of the oldest surviving houses and farm buildings were built in clay (the houses are known as "dabbins" or "daubins"), and many of them are listed. During the 19th century the Carlisle Canal was built through the parish and, when this closed, its line was converted into the Port Carlisle Dock and Railway. Three surviving bridges and an aqueduct surviving from this are listed. Most of the other listed buildings are houses and associated structures, and farmhouses and farm buildings. In addition, the listed buildings include a church, a former Friends' meeting house, a monument, and a public house.


Key

Buildings

References

Citations

Sources

Lists of listed buildings in Cumbria
Listed buildings